Oye Mi Canto!: Los Éxitos (U.S. & Latin American title) / Oye Mi Canto!: Los Grandes Éxitos (European title) is the fifth compilation album released by American singer Gloria Estefan, but is the twenty-sixth album overall, released in 2006. As of July 2007 it sold 29,000 in USA.

Track listing

Chart positions

References

External links
Gloria! Discography Database

2006 greatest hits albums
Gloria Estefan compilation albums
2006 video albums